The C257 Mercedes-Benz CLS is the third generation of the CLS range of four-door sedan, and was launched in 2018 as the successor to the Mercedes-Benz CLS (C218). It is only available as a sedan, with no plans to introduce a Shooting Brake variant in the near future. It is based heavily on the E-Class (W213).

Development and launch 
Information on the C257 CLS was released online on 29 November 2017, with a public unveiling at the Detroit Auto Show in January 2018.

The new CLS uses a four-link front suspension and a five-link rear suspension and comes in rear-wheel drive and all-wheel drive (4MATIC) configurations. CLS 53 4MATIC+ models utilise variable all-wheel drive, allowing for torque distribution between the front and rear axles.

The CLS is also now a five-seater car, instead of being a four-seater as with the previous two generations.

Equipment 
Standard equipment includes LED headlights, 18-inch alloy wheels, ambient lighting, as well as lane keeping and speed limit assistance systems. CLS models also feature 'Mercedes me' online services with a built-in LTE module in the car, enabling concierge services and remote control of the car. Optional equipment includes air suspension and a widescreen cockpit consisting of two 12.3-inch displays on the dashboard. An AMG line is also available and includes AMG body styling, a diamond pattern radiator grille, 19-inch alloy wheels, and a flat-bottomed sports steering wheel.

Models

Petrol engines

Diesel engines

References

External links 

 Official site

CLS
Rear-wheel-drive vehicles
Luxury vehicles
Sports sedans
Coupés
Cars introduced in 2018
2020s cars